Ditchingham Hall is an English country house, near the village of Ditchingham in south Norfolk, England, which is set in  about  of parkland landscaped by Capability Brown. 
It is the country house of Earl Ferrers since it was inherited by the 13th Countess Ferrers. The current owner is Robert William Saswalo Shirley, 14th Earl Ferrers. It is a private house and not open to the public.

History
The house was built in 1710 by Revd John James Bedingfeld and replaced an earlier one. In 1885, the house and estate were bought from the Bedingfield family by William Carr. The hall was enlarged in 1910 by his son, also William Carr, but reduced in size in the 1980s.

The writer Diana Athill was brought up in Ditchingham Hall. The Great Storm of 1987 did great damage to the estate trees according to the German author W. G. Sebald who was visiting at the time.

References

Country houses in Norfolk
Grade I listed buildings in Norfolk
Grade I listed houses
South Norfolk
Houses completed in 1710